Gol Mohammad Langeh (also Romanized as Golmohammad Lengeh) is a village in Goli Jan Rural District, in the Central District of Tonekabon County, Mazandaran Province, Iran. At the 2006 census, its population was 57, in 16 families.

References 

Populated places in Tonekabon County